Su Jingyu (Chinese:苏镜宇, born February 4, 1987) is a Chinese footballer who played as a striker.

Club career
Su Jingyu originally began his football career playing for the Shanghai Shenhua youth team, however he would begin his professional football career when he joined Henan Construction during the 2007 league season. He would have to wait until the 2008 Chinese Super League season before he would make his league debut coming on as a late substitute against Shandong Luneng on November 12, 2008 in a 1-0 defeat. Gradually establishing himself within the team throughout the rest of the 2008 and 2009 league season Su Jingyu would eventually score his first goal against Changsha Ginde on August 30, 2009 in a 3-0 win.

Su joined China League One team Guangdong Sunray Cave in February 2013.

References

External links
Player profile at Sodasoccer.com

1987 births
Living people
Sportspeople from Zhangjiakou
Chinese footballers
Footballers from Hebei
Henan Songshan Longmen F.C. players
Hebei F.C. players
Guangdong Sunray Cave players
Cangzhou Mighty Lions F.C. players
Chinese Super League players
China League One players

Association football forwards